Blainville—Deux-Montagnes (formerly known as Deux-Montagnes) was a federal electoral district in Quebec, Canada, that was represented in the House of Commons of Canada from 1979 to 1997.

The riding was created as "Deux-Montagnes" in 1976 from parts of Argenteuil—Deux-Montagnes and Terrebonne ridings. It was renamed "Blainville—Deux-Montagnes" in 1977. The electoral district was abolished in 1996, and divided between Saint-Eustache—Sainte-Thérèse and Terrebonne—Blainville ridings.

Blainville—Deux-Montagnes initially consisted of the cities of Deux-Montagnes and Sainte-Thérèse; the towns of Blainville, Boisbriand, Lorraine, Rosemère, Saint Eustache and Sainte-Marthe-surle-Lac; and the village municipality of Pointe-Calumet and the parish municipality of Saint-Joseph-du-Lac in the county of Deux-Montagnes. In 1987, it was redefined to consist of the towns of Blainville, Boisbriand, Deux-Montagnes, Lorraine, Rosemère, Saint-Eustache, Sainte-Marthe-sur-le-Lac and Sainte-Thérèse.

Members of Parliament

This riding has elected the following Members of Parliament:

Election results

  
|Liberal
|Francis Fox
|align="right"|34,885

  
|Progressive Conservative
|François de Sales Robert
|align="right"|5,042 
 
|New Democratic
|Normand Labrie 
|align="right"|3,472

|-
  
|Liberal
|Francis Fox 
|align="right"|35,979
 
|New Democratic
|Normand Labrie
|align="right"|5,460
  
|Progressive Conservative
|François de Sales Robert 
|align="right"| 3,448 

  
|Progressive Conservative
|Monique Landry
|align="right"|28,863
  
|Liberal
|Francis Fox 
|align="right"|23,732
 
|New Democratic
| Normand J. Labrie
|align="right"|5,609 

 
|No affiliation
|Charles C. Chiasson
|align="right"|113 

 
|Independent
|Katy S. Le Rougetel 
|align="right"|26   

  
|Progressive Conservative
|Monique Landry
|align="right"|40,810
  
|Liberal
|Zsolt Pogany
|align="right"|13,787
 
|New Democratic
|Louisette Tremblay-Hinton
|align="right"|9,243

  
|Liberal
|Pierre Brien
|align="right"|18,830 
  
|Progressive Conservative
|Monique Landry
|align="right"|11,823
  
|Natural Law
|Linda Légaré-St-Cyr
|align="right"|1,009
 
|New Democratic
|Jean-Paul Rioux
|align="right"| 853

See also 

 List of Canadian federal electoral districts
 Past Canadian electoral districts

External links 
 Riding history for Deux-Montagnes from the Library of Parliament
Riding history for Blainville—Deux-Montagnes from the Library of Parliament

Former federal electoral districts of Quebec
Blainville, Quebec